To go nap is an English expression meaning to score or win five times or, alternatively, to risk everything on one attempt. More broadly it can mean to take everything.

Origin 
The phrase originates from a bid in the card game of Napoleon, known colloquially as "Nap", in which a player undertakes to win all five tricks. Napoleon appeared in the 1880s in England and the phrase has been used since about 1885.

Derivatives 
A derived expression is "nap hand", which is a situation where there is a high chance of success if risk is taken. It is based on the fact that a player willing to risk announcing a Nap in the card game is likely to have a strong hand.

Examples 
 "Ipswich Athletic also went nap, defeating Carlton Colville Town 5-2."
 "The way in which he went 'nap' on this particular occasion was this: He had exhausted all his policy measures and in order to go 'nap' he went to the Old Country and borrowed as much money as he possibly could. I have supplied honourable gentlemen already with figures which conclusively show that between 1898 and 1903 our public debt went up by leaps and bounds, and that is what I call going 'nap'. It is going 'nap' with the credit of the country."

Footnotes

References

Bibliography 
 Soanes, Catherine and Angus Stevenson (2005). Oxford Dictionary of English. 2nd edn. Oxford: OUP. 

British English idioms
1880s neologisms